Plain City is a city in Weber County, Utah, United States. The population was 5,476 at the 2010 census. It is part of the Ogden–Clearfield, Utah Metropolitan Statistical Area. The current mayor is Jon Beesley.

History
The Salt Lake Valley settlement began when wagon trains of members of the Church of Jesus Christ of Latter-day Saints began arriving in 1847. By 1858, farmers from the then-settled towns of Lehi and Kay's Creek, looking for a new place to homestead, began considering the area now known as Plain City. On 17 March 1859, led by Lorin Farr, a group arrived to begin homesteading. Soon after arriving, the group surveyed a townsite and assigned building lots. The town layout used an organized grid system of blocks and streets, originally six blocks north-to-south and three blocks east-to-west. The first settlers were allowed their choice in the selection of a lot.

Trucking
Plain City residents were responsible for the creation and growth of several nationwide trucking companies:
Maude Knight married Chester Rodney England in 1916; he founded C.R. England Trucking in 1920 to haul produce for nearby farmers.
Carl Moyes, a driver for C.R. England in the 1940s, and his two sons, Jerry and Ronald, were childhood friends with Jeff England, son of Gene and grandson of Chester. Carl would leave C.R. England to found his own company with his wife, Betty, B & C Truck Leasing.
Carl and Betty hired the Knight cousins to drive for them. Carl and his two sons relocated to Phoenix, Arizona in 1966, and founded Common Market, a trucking company which was known as Swift Transportation by 1969.
Jeff England started Pride Transport in 1979 in Salt Lake City.
Brothers Kevin and Keith Knight, and two of their cousins who had driven for Swift Transportation in Phoenix, Randy and Gary Knight, banded together to start Knight Transportation in 1990.

Geography
According to the United States Census Bureau, the city has a total area of 11.73 square miles and 0.23 square miles of water.

Demographics

As of the census of 2000, there were 3,489 people, 979 households, and 868 families residing in the city. The population density was 935.3 people per square mile (361.2/km2). There were 1,001 housing units at an average density of 268.3 per square mile (103.6/km2). The racial makeup of the city was 97.39% White, 0.03% African American, 0.32% Native American, 0.49% Asian, 0.03% Pacific Islander, 0.63% from other races, and 1.12% from two or more races. Hispanic or Latino of any race were 2.03% of the population.

There were 979 households, out of which 52.9% had children under the age of 18 living with them, 80.3% were married couples living together, 6.3% had a female householder with no husband present, and 11.3% were non-families. 10.1% of all households were made up of individuals, and 4.5% had someone living alone who was 65 years of age or older. The average household size was 3.56 and the average family size was 3.84.

In the city, the population was spread out, with 36.4% under the age of 18, 11.6% from 18 to 24, 26.9% from 25 to 44, 18.8% from 45 to 64, and 6.4% who were 65 years of age or older. The median age was 27 years. For every 100 females, there were 103.0 males. For every 100 females age 18 and over, there were 99.1 males.

The median income for a household in the city was $57,601, and the median income for a family was $60,000. Males had a median income of $41,477 versus $26,532 for females. The per capita income for the city was $17,688. About 1.3% of families and 2.0% of the population were below the poverty line, including 2.4% of those under age 18 and none of those age 65 or over.

Education
Fremont High School, built in 1994, is located in Plain City. Fremont High School is a high school in Weber School District.

References

https://web.archive.org/web/20130403192205/http://quickfacts.census.gov/qfd/states/49/4960710.html

External links

Official website

Cities in Utah
Cities in Weber County, Utah
Ogden–Clearfield metropolitan area
Populated places established in 1858
1858 establishments in Utah Territory